Sylvie Jung Henrotin (née Jung;  ;10 July 1904 – 15 December 1970) was a French tennis player who was active during the late 1920 and the 1930s. She had her best results in the doubles event, finishing runner-up in seven Grand Slam doubles and mixed-doubles competitions.

She participated in the singles event of the Wimbledon Championships between 1930 and 1939 and her best result during that period was reaching the fourth round in 1933 and 1939. Henrotin also took part in the French Championships, reaching the quarterfinal in the singles on five occasions (1929, 1935, 1936, 1937, 1938).

She was a runner-up in the singles event of the 1933 German Championships after losing the final in straight-sets loss to Hilde Krahwinkel.

In August 1936, she won the singles title at the Eastern Grass Court Championships in Rye, New York with victories against Alice Marble and Helen Pedersen in the semifinal and final respectively. In January 1937, she won the singles, doubles and mixed-doubles title at the U.S. Indoor Championships.

Grand Slam tournament finals

Doubles: 4 (4 runner-ups)

Mixed doubles: 3 (3 runner-ups)

Grand Slam tournament timelines

Singles

Doubles

References

French female tennis players
1904 births
1970 deaths
Sportspeople from Le Havre
20th-century French women